SS Edam was the name of four ships operated by the Holland America Line.
 Edam (1881) - 2,950 tons, sank 1882 in a collision with SS Lepanto of the Wilson Line.
 Edam (1883) - 3,130 tons, sank 1895 in a collision with SS Turkistan.
 Edam (1921) - 8,871 tons, scrapped 1954 in Hong Kong.

Ship names